Blasé is an album by jazz saxophonist Archie Shepp recorded in Europe in 1969 for the BYG Actuel label.

Track listing
All tracks written and arranged by Archie Shepp, except where noted.
 "My Angel" – 10:08
 "Blasé" – 10:25
 "There Is a Balm in Gilead" (Traditional; arranged by Archie Shepp) – 5:57
 "Sophisticated Lady" (Duke Ellington, Irving Mills) – 5:11
 "Touareg" – 9:15

Personnel
 Archie Shepp – tenor saxophone
 Jeanne Lee – vocal (except on track 5)
 Dave Burrell – piano (exc. on track 5)
 Chicago Beau, Julio Finn – harmonica (on track 1 & 2) 
 Lester Bowie – trumpet, fluegelhorn (on track 3)
 Malachi Favors – bass
 Philly Joe Jones – drums

References

1969 albums
Archie Shepp albums
BYG Actuel albums